James Jordon (born 20 December 2000) is an Australian rules footballer who plays for the Melbourne Football Club in the Australian Football League (AFL).

Jordon was drafted by Melbourne with pick 33, in the 2018 AFL draft. Jordon made his AFL debut in the Demons' 22-point victory against Fremantle at the MCG in round one, 2021.

Statistics
Updated to the end of the 2022 season.

|-
| scope=row bgcolor=F0E68C | 2021# ||  || 23
| 25 || 6 || 6 || 178 || 185 || 363 || 64 || 97 || 0.2 || 0.2 || 7.1 || 7.4 || 14.5 || 2.6 || 3.9
|-
| 2022 ||  || 23
| 22 || 7 || 3 || 233 || 212 || 445 || 83 || 43 || 0.3 || 0.1 || 10.6 || 9.6 || 20.2 || 3.8 || 2.0
|- class=sortbottom
! colspan=3 | Career
! 47 !! 13 !! 9 !! 411 !! 397 !! 808 !! 147 !! 140 !! 0.3 !! 0.2 !! 8.7 !! 8.4 !! 17.2 !! 3.1 !! 3.0
|}

Notes

Honours and achievements
Team
 AFL premiership player: 2021
 McClelland Trophy: 2021

Individual
 AFL Rising Star nominee: 2021 (Round 8)

References

External links 

 
 

Living people
Australian rules footballers from Victoria (Australia)
2000 births
Melbourne Football Club players
Oakleigh Chargers players
Melbourne Football Club Premiership players
One-time VFL/AFL Premiership players